Rahi Badal Gaye is a 1985 Hindi Romantic Drama film, produced by Ravi Malhotra under the R. M. Films banner and directed by Ravi Tandon. It features Rishi Kapoor, Shabana Azmi, Padmini Kolhapure, Suresh Oberoi and Shakti Kapoor. The music was composed by R. D. Burman.

Cast 
 Rishi Kapoor as Amar Lal / Flight Lieutenant Pawan Kumar Saxena (Double Role)
 Shabana Azmi as Bhavna
 Padmini Kolhapure as Sangeeta
 Suresh Oberoi as Dr. Mehra
 Shakti Kapoor as Vikram Mehra "Vicky"
 Rajendra Nath as Raghunathan
 Ashalata Wabgaonkar as Ashalata

Soundtrack 
The film has 6 tracks which was written by Gulshan Bawra and composed by R. D. Burman.

References

External links 
 

1985 films
1980s Hindi-language films
Films scored by R. D. Burman
Films directed by Ravi Tandon